The A4080 is a British A road which is located on the Island of Anglesey, Wales.

The route
The A4080 branches off the A5 at Llanfairpwllgwyngyll, bridges the main railway line and heads south. At first it runs parallel with the Menai Strait but then moves further inland passing through the village of Brynsiencyn, where there are some sharp bends, and curving round the village of Dwyran. Another sharp bends leads to a straight section of road which passes the Anglesey Model Village. This section ends in a roundabout from which the last exit turns northwestwards and soon reaches Newborough where the B4221 branches off to the right. Passing through Newborough Forest and past Malltraeth Sands, the A4080 crosses the Afon Cefni at Malltraeth.

A section of road follows with several sharp bends, after which it passes through the villages of Hermon and Llangadwaladr, crosses some dunes and the Afon Ffraw to enter Aberffraw. About three miles later, the sea becomes visible to the left. Leaving the coast soon afterwards, the road splits; one section goes straight ahead and under the railway, while the other loops back to the left, with a small lake on the right, and enters the seaside village of Rhosneigr.

Improvements
In 2015, Anglesey County Council obtained grants worth more than £400,000 from the Road Safety Capital grants programme and the Welsh Government's "Safe Routes in Communities" scheme to make improvements to the A4080 Engedi to Aberffraw section, the A4080 Brynsiencyn to Newborough section and the B4419 Pentre Berw to Llangaffo. Works to be done included new signage, road markings and bend improvements.

References

External links

Roads in Anglesey